David Abeel (June 12, 1804 – September 4, 1846) was a missionary of the Dutch Reformed Church with the American Reformed Mission.

Biography 
Abeel was born in New Brunswick, New Jersey on June 12, 1804 to Captain David and Jane Hassert Abeel. He is a descendant of Albany, New York Mayor Johannes Abeel.

After having begun his studies in medicine, Abeel converted and was ordained a minister. He graduated from New Brunswick Theological Seminary in 1827, and was ordained to the ministry that same year. He served as a pastor of his church until the winter 1828, when he went to St. John's, Antigua and Barbuda to recover his health. He was appointed the chaplain of the Seaman's Friend Society. In 1829, he left New York to serve as a missionary. He arrived in Canton, China in 1829, later evangelizing in Java, Malacca, Siam, and Singapore. In 1833, he relocated to Europe, where he visited England, Switzerland, France, Germany, and the Netherlands through 1834.

In 1835, he returned to the United States to recruit additional missionaries from his church to work overseas. He remained in that capacity through 1838, to return to active missionary duty. In 1839, he visited Maritime Southeast Asia, and later established a mission in Xiamen in 1842. In Xiamen, Abeel met with Chinese official and scholar Xu Jiyu, who helped obtain information on conditions in the West. In 1844 he was joined by new co-workers Pohlman and Elihu Doty. Xu later used this information to compile an influential work on geography.

In 1845 he returned to the United States and died in Albany, New York, on September 4, 1846.

Works 
His published works include:
To the Bachelors of China, by a Bachelor (1833)
A Narrative of Residence in China (1834)
The Claims of the World to the Gospel (1838)
The Missionary Convention at Jerusalem (1838)

See also 
 History of Christian missions

References

Further reading 
Who Was Who in America, Historical Volume, 1607-1896. Chicago: Marquis Who's Who, 1963.

External links
David Abeel
Appleton's Cyclopedia of American Biography, edited by James Grant Wilson, John Fiske and Stanley L. Klos. Six volumes, New York: D. Appleton and Company, 1887-1889 

1804 births
1846 deaths
People from New Brunswick, New Jersey
Protestant missionaries in China
Protestant missionaries in Malaysia
Protestant missionaries in Singapore
Protestant missionaries in Thailand
Christian medical missionaries
Converts to Calvinism
19th-century American physicians
Dutch Reformed Church missionaries
Qing dynasty
American Protestant missionaries
American members of the Dutch Reformed Church
American expatriates in China
Schuyler family